The Prize is a 1963 American spy film and romantic comedy starring Paul Newman, Elke Sommer, and Edward G. Robinson. It was directed by Mark Robson, produced by Pandro S. Berman and adapted for the screen by Ernest Lehman from the novel The Prize by Irving Wallace.  It also features an early score by prolific composer Jerry Goldsmith.

Plot
The Nobel Prize in Literature has been awarded to Andrew Craig, who is disrespectful of it, and seems more interested in women and drinking. Arriving in Stockholm for the award ceremony, he is delighted that the beautiful Swedish Inger Lisa Andersson has been assigned as his personal chaperone. At the hotel where all the winners are guests, Andrew is introduced to the physics laureate, Dr. Max Stratman, an elderly German-born American, who is accompanied by his niece Emily.

The Nobel laureates for medicine are Dr. John Garrett and Dr. Carlo Farelli. Garrett thinks Farelli must have stolen his work rather than reaching the same result through improvisation as he claimed, and thus does not deserve half the prize. The chemistry winners are a married couple, Drs. Denise and Claude Marceau. Claude Marceau's mistress, Monique Souvir, is traveling with them and Denise feels neglected as a woman; later she asks Andrew to help by pretending to have an affair.

That night, Max accepts an invitation to meet an old friend, Hans Eckhart, in a park. Eckhart asks him to publicly repudiate the U.S. and the prize, and defect to East Germany. When Max refuses, he is kidnapped by communist agents, while an impostor takes his place. Emily is told that the man is Walter, the father she thought was dead, and that he will be killed if she does not play along.

The next day, Andrew is surprised when "Max" does not remember meeting him, and his manner also seems different. But there is no time to talk: Andrew has an interview scheduled. Depressed and angry at himself, he tells the press the truth: far from still being a great literary talent, he has not even been able to start writing the much-anticipated novel he has been "working on" for years. He has been drinking heavily and supporting himself by writing pulp detective stories, and is accepting the prize only because of the money. Asked for an example of developing a detective story, he suggests the possibility that Max may be an impostor.

Andrew is telephoned by an Oscar Lindblom, who offers information about Max. He goes to Lindblom's apartment and finds the man dying. He sees and chases the assassin, whose name is Daranyi, but is thrown into a canal. A cursory police investigation, with Inger and Andrew there, finds no evidence of crime; they assume he imagined it while drunk. But Lindblom's widow says he was a makeup artist: exactly what an impostor would have needed.

Emily and Andrew follow a lead to a hospital where Max is being held, but he is whisked away before they find him. Emily leaves Andrew there without a car. On foot, he is attacked again by Daranyi and flees to a nudist lecture where he must remove his clothes. He gets away by disturbing the meeting until the police are called. They again assume he is drunk and return him to his hotel wearing only a towel. He has no key, but Denise Marceau lets him into her room—where she makes sure Claude sees him, producing the desired effect on Claude.

Inger has now seen enough to realize Andrew was right and has been acting admirably, and begins falling in love as she joins in his investigation. But the next day, Andrew is told she is being held hostage. Following clues Inger helped with, Andrew sneaks on board a docked German freighter soon to depart for Leningrad. Lindblom's body is there, and Inger is locked in with Max. Andrew manages to break them out, but at the hotel, Max collapses from the strain. Drs. Garrett and Farelli diagnose cardiac arrest or ventricular fibrillation. Farelli earns Garrett's admiration by improvising a crude defibrillator. Max is revived and dressed just in time to receive his prize.

When the impostor leaves the auditorium, Daranyi kills him; dying, he admits he is not Walter either, but an actor. Andrew chases Daranyi to the roof; Daranyi again attempts to kill Andrew but is shot by police and falls to his death. Andrew returns just in time to accept his own prize—and Inger's love.

Cast 

Paul Newman as Andrew Craig
Elke Sommer as Inger Lisa Andersson
Edward G. Robinson as Dr. Max Stratman / Prof. Walter Stratman
Diane Baker as Emily Stratman
Micheline Presle as Dr. Denise Marceau
Gérard Oury as Dr. Claude Marceau
Sergio Fantoni as Dr. Carlo Farelli
Kevin McCarthy as Dr. John Garrett
Leo G. Carroll as Count Bertil Jacobsson
Sacha Pitoëff as Daranyi, Dark Henchman
Jacqueline Beer as Monique Souvir, Dr. Claude's secretary
John Wengraf as Hans Eckhart
Don Dubbins as Ivar Cramer, Light Henchman
Virginia Christine as Mrs. Bergh, Chaperon
Rudolph Anders as Mr. Rolfe Bergh, Chaperon
Martine Bartlett as Saralee Garrett
Karl Swenson as Hilding (Welcome Basket)
John Qualen as Oscar (Welcome Basket)
Ned Wever as Clark Wilson, U.S. Ambassador
Larry Adare as Davis Garrett 
Robin Adare as Amy Garrett
John Banner as German Correspondent
Sven Hugo Borg as Oscar Lindblom, Dead Make-up Artist
Peter Bourne as Swedish Man
Martin Brandt as Steen Ekberg (Airport)
Paul Busch as Deck Hand
Carol Byron as Stewardess
Carl Carlsson as Swedish Visitor
Albert Carrier as French Reporter
Jill Carson as Nudist
Jack Chefe as Reception Guest
Peter Coe as Officer
Sayre Dearing as Guest at Awards Ceremony
Noel Drayton as Constable Ströhm
Jerry Dunphy as American TV News Correspondent
Harold Dyrenforth as Swedish Officer (Nudist Meeting)
Sam Edwards as Reporter
Donald Ein as Waiter
Felda Ein as Swedish Woman
Britt Ekland as Nudist
Birgitta Engström as Young Woman
Edith Evanson as Mrs. Ahlquist (Speak English!)
Bjørn Foss as Swedish Man
Alice Frost as Mrs. Lindblom
Robert Garrett as Deck Hand
Gregory Gaye as Russian Reporter
Sam Harris as Guest at Award Ceremony
Erik Holland as Photographer
John Holland as Speaker
Fred Holliday as Swedish Officer (Nudist Meeting)
Stuart Holmes as Hotel Dining Room Guest
Mauritz Hugo as Swedish Speaker
Ike Ivarsen as Swedish Speaker
Colin Kenny as Guest at Awards Ceremony
Danny Klega as Deck Hand
Anna Lee as American Reporter
Queenie Leonard as Miss Fawley
Annalena Lund as Blonde at Nightclub
Margareta Lund as Swedish Woman
Lester Matthews as BBC News Correspondent
Grazia Narciso as Madame Farelli, Dr. Carlo's Mama
Ron Nyman as Burly Swede
Gregg Palmer as Swedish Commentator
Michael Panaieff as French Correspondent
Lars Passgård as Swedish Man
Svend Petersen as Swedish Bellboy
Pam Peterson as Nudist
Sigrid Petterson as Speaker at Nudist Meeting
Sid Raymond as Actor (Acting Walter)
Otto Reichow as Seaman
Gene Roth as Bjornefeldt, Translator
Carl Rydin as Burly Swede
Jeffrey Sayre as Reporter at Awards Announcement / Guest at Award Ceremony
Fred Scheiwiller as Deck Hand
Maria Schroeder as Nudist
Teru Shimada as Japanese Correspondent
Bert Stevens as Guest at Award Ceremony
Lyle Sudrow as Swedish Reporter
Margarto Sullivan as Nudist
Hal Taggart as Reporter
Maiken Thornberg as Nudist
Sigfrid Tor as Swedish Waiter
Arthur Tovey as Waiter at Reception
Ivan Triesault as Mr. Lindquist, Hotel Desk Porter
Raanhild Vidar as Swedish Bellboy
Karen von Unge as Hospital Receptionist
Ben Wright as British Reporter

Production
Paul Newman gave an interview to the New York Times during production on The Prize, and he insisted that actors should not accept a movie just based on a novel's status as a bestseller. He spoke from experience, having been panned in a film he took because the novel was a hit. The adapted screenplay was far more important to Newman. He said that he had not read Irving Wallace's novel and probably would not until filming was finished. "When you start doing a movie after you have read the book, you find you often have to detach yourself from the novel. You have to work to blot out your original ideas about the character. My attitude toward the character I am acting must not be cluttered by what I read in the book."

Mark Robson had intended to film on location in the Grand Hôtel and the Stockholm Concert Hall, but as the popularity of Irving Wallace's novel grew, Swedes became wary of the production. Robson had to settle on sending a crew just to shoot exteriors of the locations. His other main concern was finding the right balance in the film, "The most dangerous thing in dealing with melodrama mixed with comedy is that the laughs may come at the wrong time...I have done comedy and I have done melodrama. But this is the first time I have had to worry about both in the same picture."

Reception
Bosley Crowther dismissed the film as a farrago that is "all just a bit too garbled, illogical and wild." He admired the director's ambition, "Well, at least it's a fastmoving picture. Mark Robson, who directed, hasn't looked at a lot of old Alfred Hitchcock pictures, including 'The Lady Vanishes,' for naught."

See also
List of American films of 1963

References

External links

1963 films
1960s spy films
Metro-Goldwyn-Mayer films
Films based on American novels
Cold War spy films
American spy films
Cold War films
Films about writers
Films directed by Mark Robson
Films set in Stockholm
Films set in Sweden
Films scored by Jerry Goldsmith
Films about fictional Nobel laureates
Films based on works by Irving Wallace
Films with screenplays by Ernest Lehman
1960s American films